The  Coyote Mountains Wilderness of Arizona is part of the Coyote Mountains of southern Arizona in the center of Pima County. The wilderness lies about 40 mi southwest of Tucson, in the northwest of the Altar Valley. Kitt Peak is 4 mi WSW.

Description
The Coyote Mountains Wilderness makes up much of the center and northeast of the Coyote Mountains. The Coyote's are separated from the Quinlin Mountains abutting southwest; both ranges anchor the northern end of the north–south, massif of the Baboquivari Mountains. The three ranges are located at the northwest of the Altar Valley.

The Coyote Mountains are a small range only about 7 mi long, and merge into lower elevation hills. The north of the wilderness and mountains descend quickly into the south of the Aguirre Valley. The northeast, east, and southeast of the wilderness and the Coyote Mountains descend quickly into the Altar Valley.

Kitt Peak
Kitt Peak and surrounding peaks form a separate landform between the Quinlin Mountains and the Coyotes. The Quinlins are a linear range, northwest by southeast. From Kitt Peak and northeastwards, the mountains and hills separate into individual units. The Coyote Mountains Wilderness is the largest, and tallest unit in the northeast of the small Coyote Mountains range, which is only about 7 mi long.

Flora and fauna
Some of the common flora in the Coyote Mountains and wilderness are the paloverde tree, and the saguaro cactus. Some oak woodlands are present.

See also
 List of U.S. Wilderness Areas
 List of Arizona Wilderness Areas
 Wilderness Act

References

External links
 Coyote Mountains Wilderness Area, BLM, blm.gov – note: 40 mi southwest of Tucson
 Coyote Mountains Wilderness, wildernet (coordinates), map

Protected areas of Pima County, Arizona
Wilderness areas of Arizona
IUCN Category Ib
Bureau of Land Management areas in Arizona